Percept may refer to:
 Percept (psychology) – a stimulus of perception
 Percept (artificial intelligence) – the input that an intelligent agent is perceiving at any given moment
 Percept (information technology) – a term used in the pricing of data transfer

See also
 Perception (disambiguation)